Sebastian Anthony Pryde Usai (born 28 February 1990) is an Australian footballer who currently play as a goalkeeper for CD Robres in Spain.

Career

North Queensland Fury
Usai joined up with the North Queensland A-League outfit during the 2010-11 season as an injury replacement player. He made his professional debut in the Hyundai A-League on 8 January 2011, in a round 22 clash against Newcastle Jets in a 3–1 loss.
After the Fury folded at the end of the season Usai headed to England in search of trials.

Blackburn Rovers 
In August, just before Usai was going to return home, he was contacted by Gary Bowyer and after impressing in a trial he signed a deal to the end of the season with an option for a second year.

On 13 May 2012, Usai sat on the bench during Rovers 2–1 defeat by Chelsea in their final match of the 2011–12 Premier League season. His call up to the first team was due to both Paul Robinson and Mark Bunn being injured. He left the club on 8 August 2013 after mutually agreeing termination of his contract.

Cowdenbeath
On 31 January 2014, Usai moved from AFC United to Cowdenbeath. On 25 May 2014, he was released by the club.

Brisbane Strikers 
On January 1, 2016, Usai returned to the Brisbane Strikers for his second stint at the club. Usai won goalkeeper of the year in his first season back in the NPL QLD and promptly indicated his intention was to return to Europe.

Friska Viljor FC 
On January 1, 2017, Usai returned to Europe signing with Friska Viljor FC. In October 2019, Usai was nominated for Sweden Division 2 Goalkeeper of the year.

CD Robres 
On February 3, 2020, Spanish club CD Robres announced via Twitter it had signed Usai. He returned home to Queensland during the global COVID-19 pandemic and signed for Football Queensland Premier League side Logan Lightning on August 1, 2020.

References

External links 
Sebastian Usai Player Profile at rovers.co.uk

1990 births
Living people
Australian soccer players
Northern Fury FC players
A-League Men players
National Premier Leagues players
Blackburn Rovers F.C. players
Cowdenbeath F.C. players
Scottish Professional Football League players
AFC Eskilstuna players
Association football goalkeepers